The National Civil Police of El Salvador (Spanish: Policía Nacional Civil de El Salvador), also known as PNC, is the national civilian police of El Salvador. Although the National Civil Police is not part of the Armed Forces of El Salvador (Army, Navy, and Air Force), it constitutes along with them the "Civilian Force". It was created after the Peace Accords were signed at Chapultepec Castle in Mexico City on January 16, 1992, and began the operations on February 1, 1993, in order to guarantee the order, safety, and the public tranquility for every single corner of El Salvador. The PNC is a replacement of the National Police of El Salvador.

History
Between 1884 and 1889 the Rural Police (which would later become the National Police) and Mounted Police developed from the private armies of wealthy landowners. In the early days of the Republic of El Salvador, the Civil Guard was created in 1867, which then gave way to the National Guard in 1912. At the end of the Salvadoran Civil War law enforcement bodies in El Salvador included the National Police (Policia Nacional), the Treasury Police, and the National Guard.  All were part of the Armed Forces of El Salvador.  According to the Commission on the Truth for El Salvador, these police agencies perpetrated many human rights abuses during the civil war. The civil war ended with the Chapultepec Peace Accords, which sets limitations on the involvement of the military in internal security and set expectations for the respect of human rights by security forces. Establishing civilian control of law enforcement agencies was a central tenet of the peace accords which ended the war only after the government and the guerrillas agreed to create a new National Civil Police, incorporating both former police and ex-insurgents as well as a large proportion of previous non-combatants into its ranks.  The office of U.S. Senate Majority Whip Alan Cranston (D-California) played a key role in brokering that final agreement, which included the U.S. Department of Justice taking the lead among international actors in establishing the new force.

According to El Salvador's current constitution, the National Civil Police is the only force in charge of keeping order, security and public tranquility in the country, with different functions from the army. As part of the peace process, the National Guard and the Treasury Police were supposed to be abolished immediately; it took some time, but eventually was accomplished.

The National Civil Police (PNC) emerged as the primary law enforcement agency by 1993, at which point José Maria Monterrey was appointed as the first Director General of the PNC. In the 1990s the government attributed El Salvador’s high murder rates (65 out of every 100,000 people) to increasing gang related activity. Under the administration of President Francisco Flores, the PNC attempted to crack down on gangs as part of a policy called Mano Dura or "Iron Fist".

Despite the peace accords setting strict limits on the involvement of the military in the PNC, a retired military general, Francisco Ramon Salinas Rivera, was hired as the Director of the PNC in 2012. however, due to his ties with the military, the Supreme court viewed his appointment as violating the peace accords, and he was removed from office. Rivera was replaced by Howard Augusto Cotto Castaneda in 2014, two years after his initial appointment was called into question.

Hierarchical organization and responsibilities
According to the Chapultepec Peace Accords the PNC should not be connected to, or under the influence of any aspect of the Military forces. Within the PNC the Director General is at the top of the hierarchy. The President of the Republic of El Salvador has the power to appoint and replace the Director General of the PNC as they see fit; and under certain circumstances, such as a violation of human rights, the Legislator can suggest and enforce the removal of a Director General of the PNC. The Director General is responsible for hiring within the PNC, implementing public security policies, and drafting the PNC’s budget. Additionally, the Director General oversees six main subdirectories: Public Security, Investigations, Specialized Operative Areas, Land transportation, Rural Police, and Administration and Finances. The Deputy Director General is the second highest position in the PNC, overseeing the Deputy Directors of Investigations, Public Security, Administration, Intelligence, and Operational and Specialized Areas. The Inspector General (who reports to the Director General of the PNC) monitors the PNC for violations of human rights and the Peace Accords. The PNC also contains the Disciplinary Investigation Unit, the Control Unit, and the Internal Affairs Unit which all hold members of the PNC accountable.

Members of the PNC are divided into the general categories which contribute to the hierarchical structure of the institution. Police officers, Corporals and Sergeants are at the “Basic Level”; Sub-inspectors, Inspectors, and Chief Inspector fall within the “Executive Level”; and the “Superior Level” consists of the Sub-Commissioners and Commissioners.

Weapons

The Salvadoran police use the same kind of small arm types in all their branches. Also it uses, telescopic sights, Aimpoint T2 Micro, Ohuhu OH-RG-SC Reflex Sights (panoramic sights), EOTech EXPS 3-0 sights, Barska Holographic Reflex Red Dot Sight, Ozark Rihno Tactical Sights, Trijicon MRO-C sights, EOTech 512..A65 sights, Vortex Optics StrikeFire II sights, Burrist Fast BFire3, Tasco Red Dot Sights, CVLIFE Optics Hunting Rifle Scope 2.5x40e red and green illuminated crosshair mount sights in every kind of assault rifle and rifle the every branch of the Salvadoran police forces.

Historical secret police organizations
—Organización Democrática Nacionalista (ORDEN) (Nationalist Democratic Organization)

—Frente Democrático Nacionalista (FDN) (Nationalist Democratic Front).

The National Academy of Public Security (ANSP) 
In order to enter the PNC as an officer, citizens are required to successfully complete training at the National Academy of Public Security (ANSP). Officers graduate the ANSP with training in security and human rights. As methods and techniques evolve, officers are required to complete additional training so that the PNC is as effective as possible. In order to receive certain promotions or work on specialized units, PNC officers must successfully pass courses and exams associated with the potential position.

Combatting gang violence 
El Salvador is consistently ranked among the most violent countries in the world. In 1999 El Salvador’s homicide rate (65/100,000 people) was the highest in the region. President Francisco Flores asserted that the increase in gang related activity was the cause of increasing violence and instituted the Mano Dura or “Iron Fist” approach to decreasing gang activity. The Iron Fist approach to gang activity weakened the requirements for PNC officers to arrest and detain citizens. One law, created in 2003 under the Flores administration, made gang membership illegal; essentially allowing PNC officers to arrest citizens suspected of gang activity.

In 2009 the election of President Mauricio Funes was the beginning of not only a major political transition but also a significant shift in strategies for combating gang activities. Funes’ election marked the first time that the leftist political party known as the Farabundo Marti National Liberation Front (FMLN) had won the presidency since it was founded at the end of the Civil War in 1992 by marxist guerrillas. The Funes administration’s community and peace based approach to gang activity was in sharp contrast to his predecessor’s Iron Fist approach. Under the Funes administration, two prominent gangs (MS-13 and the 18th Street Gang) signed a truce in 2012 in an attempt to decrease intra-gang warfare. Initially the government stated that they did not participate in the truce negotiations. However, the government later announced it would accommodate and support the truce after as many as 30 high profile gang members were moved out of maximum security prisons and granted increased visitation rights. Thus, the government did not formally negotiate with criminals, but rather took steps to encourage the peace process. The FMLN won the Presidency again in 2014 as Sanchez Ceren (the Vice President in the Funes administration) took office. Ceren's administration quickly demonstrated their intention to depart with Funes’ strategies by rejecting the truce and prosecuting officials who were involved in the process. The political change from Funes to Ceren led to a shift back to more aggressive methods of combating gang violence by implementing policies reminiscent of the Mano Dura years. The resurgence of the “iron fist” approach to policing gang activity was part of Ceren’s plan, “El Salvador Seguro”. With the truce abandoned in 2014, violence was rising again; by the end of 2015 El Salvador’s homicide rate (105/100,000) was not only the highest in the region, but the highest in the world.

In accordance  with “El Salvador Seguro” the PNC implemented emergency measures in 2016 in attempt to reduce the homicide rate. Law reforms implemented as part of the PNC’s emergency measures lead to the designation of gangs as terrorist organizations; effectively allowing the police to target and arrest citizens suspected of being gang members, or participating in gang related activity, with even less evidence. While the harassment and mass incarceration of certain citizens based on limited evidence and suspected affiliation with a gang violates due process and other aspects of human rights, it is technically legal under the 2016 law reforms. The return to more aggressive methods of combating gang activity also corresponded with an increase in extrajudicial killings. The 2016 law reforms did not grant PNC officers the power to legally execute suspects; however, officers avoid consequences for extrajudicial activities due to a combination of a weak judicial system and support from Mano Dura policies.

Controversy and corruption
The homicide rate dropped from 105/100,000 in 2015 to 60/100,000 in 2017, however this drop came with an uptick in accusations of PNC officers abusing their power. One of the most significant issue with the PNC’s use of force is the increase in reports of extrajudicial executions. In September 2018 the Inter-American Commission on Human Rights (IACHR) received reports of the PNC using extrajudicial killings to curb gang activity from the Human Rights Institute of José Simeón Cañas Central American University and the NGO Passionist Social Service. By August 2017, the ratio of presumed gang members to PNC officers killed in confrontations was 73 to 1; the IACHR asserts that the ratio demonstrates an abuse of force by the PNC. Early in 2018 the PNC shut down an elite police unit after it was accused of police brutality via extrajudicial execution of suspected gang members. Over the course of six months the Special Reaction Forces (FES) killed 43 gang members, causing people to question the legality of the PNC Unit’s actions. Following the closure of the FES, the PNC created a new elite police unit with essentially the same responsibilities and jurisdiction as the FES called the Jaguars. Despite facing charges of extrajudicial killings, former members of the FES were allowed to join the Jaguars. In another example, a text conversation between PNC officers, leaked by an anonymous officer, discusses strategies for hiding executions; effectively demonstrating the presence of illegal practices within the PNC.

A UN report by Agnes Callamard states that the vast majority of officers under investigation (about 92%) are back on duty within 3 days. In 2016 the Director General of the PNC, Mauricio Landaverde, stated that “All members of the PNC that have to use weapons against criminals due to their work as officers should do so with complete confidence. The PNC and the government will protect them”. Landaverde, in this case, seemingly promotes the use of extralegal action and promises not to hold officers accountable for potential abuses of power. In one case, a Judge established that at least one of eight people killed during a shootout in San Blas was the victim of an illegal execution at the hands of the police. However, because the prosecution could not identify which specific officer was directly responsible for the execution, all charges against the eight PNC officers on trial were dropped.

See also

Crime in El Salvador

External links
 National Civil Police official page 
 Facebook Official Page 
 Official YouTube Channel

References

Law enforcement agencies of El Salvador
1992 establishments in El Salvador
Government agencies established in 1992
Salvador